The Taungdwingyi Cultural Museum is a museum to display cultural materials of the Pyu Period excavated from ancient city. It houses lacquer wares, clay-pipes, Pyu coins, glass-wares, Buddha images, burial, palanquins and divans located in Near Shwe Inntaung Pagoda, Taungdwingyi, Magway District, Magway Division (Upper Myanmar).

It was established in December 1996. Admission fees is 2 US $ and opening hour is from 10:00 am to 3:30 pm (from Tuesday to Sunday).

References

Museums in Myanmar
Magway Region
Museums established in 1996